Alcott is an impact crater on Venus. Lava produced by a volcano at one point filled the crater and altered its rim.

References

Impact craters on Venus